Myxomitodes (Greek "slime thread like") is a genus of problematic fossil from the Paleoproterozoic (1900 million years old) Stirling Range Formation of Western Australia, and is significant as a very old megascopic fossil, and thus eukaryote. It is a trace fossil and thus evidence of activity, rather than a body fossil.

Description
Myxomitodes stirlingensis are irregular markings on the surface of beds, with the superficial appearance of animal trails. They are problematic for such trails because of their great geological age. Unlike fossil trails made by slugs or worms, Myxomitodes flare and vary in width. Worm and slug trails are long, so generally run off the edges of rock slabs. Myxomitodes in contrast is short, with one end tapering and the other forming a bulbous structure.

Biological affinities
Myxomitodes stirlingensis is a problematic fossil of controversial biological affinities. At first it was interpreted as a trail of a soft-bodied worm-like animal, and then as a trail of wind blown bubbles. Later it was suggested to be a trace of a giant globular, marine amoeba, similar to Gromia. Discovery of a variety of paleosols associated with Myxomitodes  suggests that it might have lived on land like dictyostelid slime molds. These are dispersed soil amoebae for most of their life cycle, but occasionally stream together to form a grex, or slug-like multicellular aggregate that moves a short distance to form a sporulating stalk. This explanation explains the flaring shape (from cellular aggregation), levees (from slime trail), short length (migration distance) and bulbous ends (base of sporulating stalk).

References

External links

Paleoproterozoic
Fossils of Australia
Controversial taxa